Le Retour d’un aventurier  is a 1966 pop art film. In this African-style Western, director Moustapha Alassane delves into African mimicry.

Synopsis 
A man returns home to his village with Western cowboy duds, and forms a gang with his old buddies. Getting into their role, the black cowboys spread panic throughout the village with brawls and robberies.

External links 
 
 

1966 films
Nigerien drama films
1966 Western (genre) films